Mike Jacoby (born May 1969) is an American snowboarder who competed in the 1998 Nagano Winter Olympics.

Early life 
Jacoby was born in Bellevue, Washington. grew up in Idaho Falls, Idaho. Was a hockey player. Grew up alpine and cross-country skiing  until he was 14, when he built his first snowboard and began snowboarding.

Snowboarding career 
First event 1986 swatch world championships in Breckenridge Co
Junior 16 and under
Slalom 7th
Giant slalom 8th
Half pipe 5th

1987 Swatch World championship 
Mens am auteur 
Slalom 1st
Giant slalom 1st
Halfpipe 14th
This was the first event the J-tear was done in a event.

The first World Cup tour was 1988

1991 Overall World Champion (ISF tour)

1992 Overall World Super-G Champion (ISF tour)

Jacoby won the gold medal in both the 1995 and 1996 World Cup giant slalom. He placed second in the 1996 FIS Snowboarding World Championships giant slalom, and in the 1997 Snowboarding World Championships placed first in the parallel slalom and second in the giant slalom. He placed 17th in the 1998 Winter Olympics.

In 2010 Jacoby was injured while mountain biking, and received a severe head injury.

Sailed singlehanded the Pacific loop. July 18 2016 - August 29 2021
1980 Ingrid 38’

References 

1969 births
Living people
American male snowboarders
Olympic snowboarders of the United States
Snowboarders at the 1998 Winter Olympics
20th-century American people
21st-century American people